Sarawak Stadium is a multi-purpose stadium in Kuching, Malaysia.  It is currently used mostly for football matches.  The stadium has a capacity of 40,000 spectators.

History
It was built in 1995 for the 1997 FIFA World Youth Championship. The stadium is adjacent to the old stadium, the Sarawak State Stadium (Stadium Negeri) that was previously used to stage various tournaments and championship.

The stadium is the home of Sarawak FA, a local council football team. However, due to damaged facilities and stadium renovation, Sarawak FA currently playing in the State Stadium until the renovation complete before the 2016 Sukma Games.

Facilities
The stadium was completed in April 1997, and is one of Asia's world-class stadiums. It consists of 4 levels, with an electronic multimedia scoreboard, manila grass football field with patented drainage and synthetic running track.

The stadium is also equipped with:
VIP driveway
320 parking lots
stadium office
gymnasiums
changing and massage rooms
workshops
canteen
security control centre
dope testing area
medical clinics
saunas 
prayer rooms
facilities for the disabled and VVIPs.

Notable Matches
Quarter-final Match between Brazil and Argentina during the 1997 FIFA World Youth Championship
The 1998 Charity Shield match between Sarawak FA and Selangor FA 
Quarter-final Match of the 1998–99 Asian Cup Winners' Cup between Sarawak FA and Kashima Antlers of Japan.
Fourth venue (Group D) to host matches of Malaysia, Chelsea, Bayern Munich and PSV Eindhoven for the Champions Youth Cup 2007.

References

Football venues in Malaysia
Athletics (track and field) venues in Malaysia
Multi-purpose stadiums in Malaysia
Buildings and structures in Kuching
1997 establishments in Malaysia
Sports venues in Sarawak
Tourist attractions in Kuching
Sports venues completed in 1997